Devil On My Back is a teenage science fiction dystopian novel by Canadian author Monica Hughes.  It was first published in 1984. Devil on My Back is the first book of the ArcOne Series and its sequel is The Dream Catcher.

Synopsis
In a parallel future, the Earth has gone through an environmental disaster and subsequent "Age of Confusion." During this, a group of scientists build a great self-controlled city called Arc One to house the survivors and save all human knowledge. Knowledge has been relegated to devices called "info paks" which enable the wearer to tap into Arc One's computer to access the information. Over time, a caste system has developed.

Many generations later, the son of one of the leading Lords of the City, Tomi, is on his Access Day, the day when he first gets to receive his final info pak, and gain total access to Arc One's computer. Two of his close friends reject the info paks, and become a slave and a worker respectively. Sensing Tomi's discomfort with how his friends violently reacted against the info paks, Tomi's teacher prescribes recreation at Dreamland, a fantasy computer program.

The next day, during a ceremony to honour the New Lords, the slaves rebel. Tomi manages to escape and hide in a garbage chute. As soldiers arrive to put down the rebellion, Tomi loses consciousness and slides down the chute, emerging outside the City in a rapidly flowing river.

In the outside world, Tomi encounters a community living as hunter-gatherers, and is confronted with shocking truths about the world he left behind.

Publication information
Hughes, Monica (1986).  Devil on My Back.  Starfire.  .

1984 Canadian novels
1984 science fiction novels
Children's science fiction novels
Canadian young adult novels
Canadian science fiction novels
Dystopian novels
Novels by Monica Hughes